Giselle Bellas (often referred to mononymously by her stage name Giselle), is a Cuban-American singer-songwriter. Born in Miami, Florida, and based out of New York City, she is most known for her work on season 5 of Louis C.K.'s FX series Louie.

Background

Originally from Miami, Florida, Giselle moved to New York City to pursue a singing career. Though classically trained in opera, Giselle's vocal style evolved as she began charting new territories as a songwriter. Inspired by her family's taste in predominantly Latin music, jazz, and oldies, in addition to her own love of classical music and pop culture, Giselle began to build a successful music career of her own. Her sound has been called a combination of the "dark ethereal nature of Fiona Apple and the vibrant passion of Florence & The Machine set in a smoky jazz club."

Career 
Giselle's classical training in opera was a path that led her to meet her now producer and guitarist, Adam Tilzer, and record songs for Emmy Award winning FX comedy series Louie in 2015. Among these songs was the "Diarreah Song" which would quickly become a viral hit, garnering nearly half a million YouTube views and receiving national praise. Following the song's success, Giselle continued working with Tilzer, and in 2016, released her debut EP, Change Me.

In 2017, Giselle collaborated with Kenyan rapper Xtatic in covering late R&B artist Aaliyah's "Are You That Somebody?" to commemorate the singer's birthday. Later that year, Giselle released her first full-length album, titled Not Ready To Grow Up (stylized as not ready to grow up), marking Giselle's artistic evolution and featuring her most honest, vulnerable music to date. Shortly before the album's release, Giselle launched a women directors campaign, aiming to consecutively release a video for every song on the album, each directed by a different female director. not ready to grow up was voted winner of Sinister Girlz' 2017 Fan Favorite Contest.

In January 2018, Giselle placed 2nd in social live streaming platform Live.Me's NYC Street Beats Contest, giving her the opportunity to perform at a pre-Grammy pop-up concert at Grand Central Terminal among four other contestants and special guest, Wyclef Jean. Giselle continues to stream regularly on the app, through which she has gained a significant social media following.

On February 17, 2020, Giselle released am a cappella cover of "Unchained Melody", in preparation for her new cover EP "Bring the Curtain Down". On April 2, 2020 Giselle released an official promotional 1950's inspired trailer for the EP, before releasing it on April 14, 2020. The EP features six covers of famous oldies songs, with a lilting spin on each.

On June 24th, 2020, Giselle released a cover of "La Vida Es Un Carnaval" by Celia Cruz, in quarantine during the COVID-19 pandemic.

Giselle Bellas often posts covers that she's coined "Guerilla Covers"; covers released  on YouTube 24 - 48 hours after the original artist's release. Bellas has covered artists such as Alicia Keys, Lady Gaga, Ed Sheeran, and The Weeknd.

Advocacy
As a tribute to her grandmother who died from Alzheimer's disease in 2016, Giselle wrote the track, "Hazy Eyes" and has since become an advocate, working closely with Alzheimer's organizations such as Alzheimer's New Jersey and Act Now.

Discography

Albums

 "Change Me" (2016)
 "Not Ready To Grow Up" (2017)
"Bring the Curtain Down" (2020)

Singles
"Hazy Eyes" (2016)
"I'll Be Home for Christmas" (2016)
"Devil in the Details" (2019)
"Dancing in the Moonlight" (2019)
"La Vida Es Un Carnaval (Live Quarantine Edition)" (2020)

Filmography
Louie (2015)
E.ro.sion, noun (2017)

References

External links

Year of birth missing (living people)
Living people
Singers from Florida
American musicians of Cuban descent
American indie pop musicians
21st-century American women singers
Hispanic and Latino American women singers
Musicians from Miami